The Anadyr Highlands are a mountainous area in the Chukotka Autonomous Okrug, Far Eastern Federal District, Russia.

Geography
The Anadyr Highlands are one of the two main mountain regions of Chukotka Autonomous Okrug. They rise southwest of the Chukotka Mountains, in the western Chukotka region. Medium height mountain ranges stretch in roughly WNW/ESE direction west of a large plateau and in a SW/NE direction in the south. The highlands rise between the Chaun Lowlands in the north, the Anadyr Lowlands in the southeast, the Kolyma Mountains in the southwest and the Kolyma Lowlands, where the Kolyma River flows, in the west.

Among the rivers that have their source in the mountains, the main ones are the Anadyr River flowing off the highland limits to the southeast as the Belaya, the Bolshoy Anyuy and the Maly Anyuy —flowing westwards on both sides of the Anyuy Range. The Enmyvaam flows southwards out of Lake Elgygytgyn, later joining the Belaya, while the Chaun River flows northwards from the northwestern edge of the crater of the lake.

Anadyr Plateau
The main feature of the highlands is the Anadyr Plateau, which forms most of the eastern part. 

It is located in the latitude of the Arctic Circle and limited by the Pekulney Range to the east. Lake Elgygytgyn, an impact crater lake is located in a roughly central position. The plateau is largely covered with tundra and shrubs.

Subranges
Besides the Anadyr Plateau, the system of the Anadyr Highlands comprises a number of subranges, including the following:

Tainykot Range, highest point  —the northwesternmost
Rauchuan Range, highest point Mount Belaya,  
Ilirney Range, highest point Dvukh Tsirkov (Двух Цирков) 
Anyuy Range, highest point Blokhin Peak,   
Neuten Range, highest point 
Chuvanay Range, highest point Mount Chuvanay (гора Чуванаи), 
Kyrganay Range, highest point 
Pyrkanay Range, highest point 
Shchuchy Range, highest point 
Osinov Range, highest point

See also
List of mountains and hills of Russia

References

External links
Geography of Chukotka Autonomous Okrug
Geological study of Chukotka
Wetlands in Russia - Vol.4

Mountain ranges of Russia
Landforms of Chukotka Autonomous Okrug
East Siberian Mountains